The Apkhyarta (Ap'hyartsa) is a bowed long-neck lute from Abkhazia. Bowed instrument of 1-2 strings played in Abkhazia. Ap'hyartsa, a two-stringed instrument with a narrow spindle-shaped frame, played with a bow and usually carved from alder wood.

See also
Shichepshin
Dala fandyr
Chuurqin
igil
Morin khuur

References

Bowed instruments
Necked bowl lutes
Necked lutes